Gudha Gorji is a town in Sekhawati 

region of Rajasthan, India. The town Gudha named after Saint Gudheshwar Maharaj  and a very religious and wise thukurainji named Gorji. Gudha Gorji is one of the important commercial towns in the Jhunjhunu district.

Gudhagorji is connected by state highway SH-37, and can be reached by car or bus from Jhunjhunu, Jaipur or Sikar. The town is about 33 km from Jhunjhunu, 50 km from Sikar and 140 km from Jaipur. At present there is no hi-fi hotel but there are hotels just to stay or for emergencies . However, tourists may stay either in dharamshala or at Jhunjhunu or Sikar. The population of the village is approximately 12 Thousand.The village can be called to a town according to its development. The language used by local people is Marwari language but everyone knows Hindi  as it is a part of north India.there is many schools nd college's.This village Calling Shiksha Nagari.

References 

Villages in Jhunjhunu district